Jógvan Martin Olsen (born 10 July 1961 in Toftir, Faroe Islands) is a retired football player and football manager. He is the manager of ÍF Fuglafjørður since October 2015. He was the head coach of the Faroe Islands national football team.

Playing
Jógvan Martin Olsen is a former football player. He played with B68 Toftir from 1978 to 1993 and again from 1996 to 1997 and for LÍF Leirvík 1994 and 1995.
Three times Olsen won the national Faroese championship with B68 Toftir: 1984, 1985 and 1992.

Manager career
Olsen was the assistant coach of the Faroe Islands national football team during the reign of Allan Simonsen and Henrik Larsen (both from Denmark) in the period 1996–2005. From 2002 to 2004 he was also the manager of NSÍ Runavík. In 2005 Olsen was named new head coach of the Faroe Islands national football team. He resigned on 29 September 2008.

In 2013 Jógvan Martin Olsen has announced that he will step down as coach at the end of the season and have a year off from football. In October 2015 he was appointed as manager of ÍF Fuglafjørður.

Manager
Updated 16 June 2016

References

 Goal.com

External links
 fsf.fo
 Vikingur.fo
 B68.fo
 faroesoccer.com

1961 births
Living people
B68 Toftir players
Faroese football managers
Faroese footballers
Faroe Islands national football team managers
People from Toftir
Association footballers not categorized by position